Kimaiyo is a surname of Kenyan origin meaning "boy born in the presence of alcohol Maiyo" (from Kip- + Maiyo) . It may refer to:

Daniel Kimaiyo (born 1948), Kenyan hurdler and two-time African champion
David Kimaiyo (born 1960), Kenyan policeman and Inspector General of the Kenya Police
Eric Kimaiyo (born 1969), Kenyan marathon runner
Fatwell Kimaiyo (born 1947), Kenyan 110 metres hurdler and two-time All-Africa Games champion
Hellen Kimaiyo (born 1968), Kenyan long-distance runner and two-time African champion

See also
Maiyo, origin of the name Kimaiyo

Kalenjin names